The Iris & B. Gerald Cantor Center for Visual Arts at Stanford University, formerly the Stanford University Museum of Art, and commonly known as the Cantor Arts Center, is an art museum on the campus of Stanford University in Stanford, California. The Cantor Arts Center houses the largest collection of sculptures by Auguste Rodin outside of Paris, with 199 works, most in bronze but others in different media. The museum is open to the public and charges no admission.

History
When it first opened its doors to the public in 1894, the Leland Stanford Jr. Museum was unique, having been privately founded by a family with a general collection of world art on par with the major public museums at the time. For decades, Leland Stanford and his wife Jane Stanford had traveled extensively, collecting American and European Old Master paintings, as well as a wide array of antiquities from Egypt, Greece, Rome, Asia, the Americas, and other parts of the world. By the turn of the century, the Stanford museum, with its large archeological and ethnological holdings as well as art, was the largest privately owned museum in the world.

The 1906 San Francisco earthquake was an enormous disaster for the museum. The Roman, Egyptian and Asian galleries were destroyed, and three-quarters of the building was damaged beyond repair. The Oxford Assyriologist Archibald Sayce, recalling a visit to Stanford in 1917, wrote that "the rooms of its spacious Museum were still a scene of wreckage. The magnificent collection of Greek vases it once contained had been hopelessly shattered; even the Egyptian mummies were torn and dismembered."

The earthquake, along with the death of co-founder Jane Stanford the previous year, sharply curtailed the budget of the museum, which had no endowment. Faculty and administration had little interest in restoring the museum, and the building and its collection fell into disrepair. Curatorial duties ceased.

In 1917 Pedro Joseph de Lemos resigned as head of the San Francisco Art Institute to teach at Stanford, where he also served as Curator and Director of the Stanford University Museum and the Thomas Welton Stanford Art Gallery until 1945.  He reorganized the museum and began a regular series of exhibitions at both venues. But during this period the art collection was decimated by loss, sales, and gifts, and the poorly secured storage area became a quarry for local collectors and dealers. In 1945, after de Lemos' departure, the museum was officially closed in order to conduct an inventory of the art holdings.

The university's art department saw the inventory as an opportunity to divest the museum of works of art lacking aesthetic merit. An enormous accumulation of worthless material was disposed of, but so too were paintings and sculptures from the original Stanford family collection judged now to be of greater value than was believed in the 1950s, including works by Albert Bierstadt, William Bradford, Norton Bush, and Thomas Hill.

In 1953, the Committee for Art at Stanford was founded, with the intention of recruiting members and raising funds to reopen the museum, and in 1954, after nine years of stocktaking, the museum reopened.

In 1963, as part of the university's revitalization of the humanities under Dean Robert R. Sears, Professor Lorenz Eitner was instated as chair of the department of art and architecture. Assisted by faculty, staff, and The Committee for Art, Eitner began to revive the museum. Over the next 25 years, galleries were gradually refurbished, collections were significantly strengthened, and a program of exhibitions, educational services, and publications was put in place. 1985 saw a major development when professor Albert Elsen worked with art collector B. Gerald Cantor and other donors to open the B. Gerald Cantor Rodin Sculpture Garden.

 The museum suffered severe damage from the 1989 Loma Prieta earthquake and was forced to close. In 1991, Stanford hired Thomas K. Seligman to direct the rebuilding of the museum. Polshek & Partners of New York (now Ennead Architects) won the architectural competition, with Richard Olcott as principal designer. Groundbreaking took place on October 26, 1995, and the museum reopened in late 1999 as the Iris & B. Gerald Cantor Center for the Visual Arts, named after Iris and B. Gerald Cantor. The project cost $36.8 million, which included a seismic retrofit of the entire building, and construction of a new 42,000 square foot wing including galleries, a sculpture terrace, auditorium, bookshop and cafe. The Rodin Sculpture Garden was renovated, and new gardens were installed for displaying contemporary art.

In 2011, Stanford University announced the donation of 121 paintings and sculptures from Harry W. and Mary Margaret Anderson, and their daughter, Mary Patricia Anderson Pence, of Atherton, California. The collection, mostly of post-WW2 American art, includes works by Mark Rothko, Richard Diebenkorn, Manuel Neri, Frank Lobdell and Willem de Kooning, and Jackson Pollock's Lucifer ("probably the privately owned 20th century American artwork most coveted by museums nationwide"). To house and display this collection, a new museum, the Anderson Collection at Stanford University, was built directly adjacent to the Cantor Arts Center. Designed by the same architect who designed the new wing of the Cantor, Richard Olcott of Ennead Architects, the Anderson Collection opened in 2014. The building has 15,000 square feet of exhibition space. Like the Cantor, the Anderson Collection is free and open to the public.

Collection
The Cantor Arts Center's collection houses over 38,000 items, including African Art, American Art, Ancient Art, the Andy Warhol Photography Archive, Art of Asia and Oceania, Art of the Indigenous Americas, Auguste Rodin, Eadweard Muybridge, European Art, Modern and Contemporary Art, Photographs, Prints and Drawings, Richard Diebenkorn Sketchbooks, Sculptures on Campus, and collections and memorabilia of the Stanford Family.

In January 2021, the Cantor Arts Center established the Asian American Art Initiaive (AAAI) with specific focus on the study, acquisition, preservation, and exhibition of works by Asian American artists. The initiative is headed by the founding co-directors Aleesa Alexander and Marci Kwon.

Gallery

References

Further reading
Elsen, Albert E. and Rosalyn Frankel Jamison. Rodin's Art: The Rodin Collection of Iris & B. Gerald Cantor Center of Visual Arts at Stanford University. Oxford: Oxford University Press, 2003. 
Joncas, Richard. Building on the Past: The Making of the Iris & B. Gerald Cantor Center for Visual Arts at Stanford University. Stanford: The , c. 1999. 
Osborne, Carol M. Museum Builders in the West: The Stanfords as Collectors and Patrons of Art, 1870–1906. Stanford University Museum of Art, 1986.

External links 

Museum History Interactive Timeline
Browse the collections
Cantor Arts Center within Google Arts & Culture

Stanford University places
University museums in California
Art museums and galleries in California
Museums in Santa Clara County, California
Neoclassical architecture in California
Art museums established in 1894
1894 establishments in California
Museums of American art
Asian art museums in California
Buildings and structures in Palo Alto, California
Buildings and structures destroyed in the 1906 San Francisco earthquake
African art museums in the United States